Sufi Comics or Sufi Studios is a Bangalore based Indian comic book publisher. In 2012 it was the first Indian publisher ever to participate in the Comic-Con International at San Diego.

Comics
They have till now published two comics:
 first comic book titled "40 Sufi Comics". The book has been translated into 7 languages including French, German, Indonesian, Norwegian, Russian, Spanish and Tamil.
 second comic book titled "The Wise Fool of Baghdad" with artist Rahil Mohsin third comic book titled "Rumi Vol.1" with artist Rahil Mohsin

The authors of both comics are Mohammed Ali Vakil and Mohammed Arif Vakil. While the first book was written and illustrated by the brothers, the brothers teamed up with Rahil Mohsin, who illustrated the Wise Fool of Baghdad. The comics are short stories taken from Islamic history to illustrate the eternal spiritual truths in the teachings of Islam. They are working on 300 plus pages graphic novel on poems of Sufi poet Rumi.

Events
Sufi comics took part in following comics events:
 Mumbai Comic Con India 2011 (Express), where they released their first comic book titled, "40 Sufi Comics" Delhi Comic Con India 2012, where they were nominated "Best Web/Digital Comic" and "Best Graphic Anthology" categories
 San Diego International Comic Con 2012
 Bangalore Comic Con 2012 (Express), where they released their second comic book titled, "The Wise Fool of Baghdad" On 28 July Comic Con India in association with Mocha (Coffees & Conversations) organised a "Special Session With Sufi Comics" was organized as a setting-stage event for Comic Con Express Bengaluru
 Mumbai film and Comic Convention 2012, where they launched their second comic book titled, "The Wise Fool of Baghdad"''
 Free Comic Book Weekend 2013
 Bangalore Comic Con 2013

Gallery

References

External links

 Sufi Comics Official Website
 Arif & Ali's Blog
 40 Sufi Comics @ Googlebooks
 The Wise Fool of Baghdad @ Googlebooks
 Sufi Comics @ Free Press Journal
  @ Deccan Herald
  @ The National

Publishing companies established in 2009
Comic book publishing companies of India
Companies based in Bangalore
Privately held companies of India
2009 establishments in Karnataka
Publishing companies of India